Kenan Atik (born 20 May 1965) is a Turkish professional football manager and former player, who both played an coached Denizlispor. He played as a midfielder during his playing career.

Professional career
Arik spent his early career with Denizlispor in the amateur leagues in Turkey, and had stints with Sivasspor, Nazilli Belediyespor, Torbalispor and Gümüşlerspor thereafter.

Managerial career
After retiring as a footballer, Atik returned to Denizlispor as a youth coach in 1999. He had a brief stint as the manager of the amateur side Yeşilköyspor. He returned to Denizlispor as an assistant manager, and had various stints as their interim manager. On 1 December 2020, he was named their interim manager once more in the Süper Lig as Robert Prosinečki was sacked.

References

External links
 
 TFF Manager Profile
 Mackolik Profile

1965 births
Living people
Sportspeople from Denizli
Turkish footballers
Turkish football managers
Denizlispor managers
Denizlispor footballers
Sivasspor footballers
Nazilli Belediyespor footballers
Association football midfielders
TFF Second League players